is a Japanese classical cellist and conductor. He is particularly noted for his interpretations of Sergei Rachmaninoff's works, in particular the Cello Sonata. His management agency is Japan Arts Corporation.

Biography
He debuted with the Philharmonia Orchestra in 2011, and has performed with orchestras such as Seiji Ozawa Festival Ensemble (Saito Kinen Orchestra members), Tokyo Symphony Orchestra and Osaka Philharmonic Orchestra, and artists as Vladimir Ashkenazy, David Geringas, Seiji Ozawa and Julian Lloyd Webber.

His debut album, Sergei Rachmaninov Complete Cello Works, with pianist Sofya Gulyak released in 2012 October, is The Strad magazine's "Recommended Disc". He will release his second album from Sony Music Entertainment in November 2017.

In 2016, he gave a recital to commemorate the 120th anniversary of Kenji Miyazawa for worldwide broadcast by NHK Japan, whose centennial anniversary recital was given by Yo-Yo Ma in 1996.

In 2014 he gave a pre-recital to Lorin Maazel at Royal Festival Hall.

Discography 
 Sergei Rachmaninov – Complete Cello Works (2012/CHRCD044)
 The Romantic" – Great Cello Works (2017/Sony Music Entertainment)

Prizes

2000: Overall winner, Sapporo Junior Cello Competition
2001: Gold medal, Osaka Junior Cello Competition (3rd Category – 13&under)
2003: Gold medal, Osaka Junior Cello Competition (2nd Category – 17&under) 
2003: 1st prize, Japan Performer Competition
2006: 1st prize, 6th Antonio Janigro International Cello Competition
2007: 1st prize, Marlow International Music Competition 
2008: 2nd prize & Audience prize, 77th Music Competition of Japan
2009: 1st prize, 20th Paris FLAME International Music Competition
2010: 1st prize, 17th International Johannes Brahms Competition
2011: 1st prize, 3rd Windsor Festival International String Competition
2012: 1st prize, 14th Young Concert Artists European Audition
2012: 2nd prize, 53rd Young Concert Artists New York Audition
2018: The 17th Hideo Saito Memorial Fund Award, given by Seiji Ozawa and Tsuyoshi Tsutsumi

Conducting
 Artistic Director/Principal Conductor of Knightsbridge Philharmonic Orchestra since 2013

See also
List of cellists

References

Winner of 2011 Windsor Festival International String Competition announced, 28 March 2011 
Japanese cellist wins Windsor Festival International String Competition, Slough Express, 24 March 2011 
Even classical musicians nowadays have to be sexy!, Anne Diamond, BBC, 24 March 2011

External links
Official Website
Japan Arts Corporation's Artist Page

Japanese classical cellists
Living people
Year of birth missing (living people)